Texas' 24th congressional district of the United States House of Representatives covers much of the suburban area in between Fort Worth and Dallas in the state of Texas and centers along the Dallas–Tarrant county line. 

The district has about 529,000 potential voters (citizens, age 18+). Of these, 57% are White, 16% Latino, 14% Black, and 10% Asian. Immigrants make up 4% of the district's potential voters. Median income among households (with one or more potential voter) in the district is about $81,900, and 46% hold a bachelor's or higher degree.

Recent election results from statewide races

List of members representing the district

Recent election results

2004

2006

2008

2010

2012

2014

2016

2018

2020

2022

See also

List of United States congressional districts

References

 Congressional Biographical Directory of the United States 1774–present

Further reading
 

24
Dallas County, Texas
Tarrant County, Texas
Denton County, Texas